674 Rachele is a minor planet orbiting the Sun. It was discovered by Wilhelm Lorenz on 28 October 1908 in Heidelberg, and was named by orbit computer Emilio Bianchi after his wife. This is classified as an S-type asteroid, indicating a stony composition.

Measurements made using the adaptive optics system at the W. M. Keck Observatory give a size estimate of 89 km. It has a size ratio of 1.08 between the major and minor axes. By comparison, measurements reported in 1998 from the IRAS observatory give a similar size of 97 km and a ratio of 1.15.

References

External links
 
 

Background asteroids
Rachele
Rachele
S-type asteroids (Tholen)
S-type asteroids (SMASS)
19081028